The Center Cross School is a historic school building at the junction of West Creek Road and West College Road in rural Franklin County, Arkansas, west of Altus.  It is an L-shaped single-story wood-frame building, with a hip roof and weatherboard siding.  A porch extends across the long front, the main roof extending over it, with box columns for support.  The school was built in 1930, during a period of prosperity.

The school was listed on the National Register of Historic Places in 1992.

See also
National Register of Historic Places listings in Franklin County, Arkansas

References

School buildings on the National Register of Historic Places in Arkansas
Buildings and structures in Franklin County, Arkansas
National Register of Historic Places in Franklin County, Arkansas
Schools in Arkansas